Line M2 is a line of the Charleroi Metro in Belgium operated by TEC Charleroi, running from the Monument tram stop in Anderlues to the metro loop around central Charleroi, before heading back to Anderlues. Introduction of new line numbers (M1, M2, M3 and M4) in February 2012 coincided with the formal association of colors to line numbers. The official color for line M2 is green.

Line M2 is identical to line M1 except that it runs along the downtown loop in a clockwise direction.

Operations
It has 29 premetro stations (18 distinct) and 12 tram stops (6 distinct). Lines M1 and M2 are the longest lines of the Charleroi Metro network.

Trams drive on the right on the entire line, but the regular tram section of the line in Anderlues (outside of premetro infrastructure) runs on the left, right, or in the middle of the street. A couple of portions of that section in Anderlues are single track. 

Because M2 trams going from Sud to Pétria enter Beaux-Arts station from the West and have to leave it to the West, a change of direction is required. Trams accomplish this by first passing through Beaux-Arts on a lateral track without stopping, before entering a loop-shaped tunnel leading back to the station but from the opposite direction.

List of stations

Tram stops
The following tram stops are found in Anderlues on the western portion of the line:

 Monument
 Route de la station
 Jonction
 Route de Thuin
 Surchiste
 Coron du Berger

Premetro stations
The following stations are found on the premetro portion of the system in the vicinity of Charleroi:

 Pétria
 Fontaine
 Paradis
 Leernes
 Morgnies
 Moulin
 De Cartier
 Providence
 Dampremy

The following stations are found on the full metro portion of the system in central Charleroi:

 Piges
 Ouest
 Villette
 Sud
 Sambre
 Tirou
 Parc
 Janson
 Waterloo
 Beaux-Arts

Charleroi Metro
Railway services introduced in 2012